Magpies are birds of the Corvidae family. Like other members of their family, they are widely considered to be intelligent creatures. The Eurasian magpie, for instance, is thought to rank among the world's most intelligent creatures, and is one of the few non-mammal species able to recognize itself in a mirror test. They are particularly well known for their songs and were once popular as cagebirds. In addition to other members of the genus Pica, corvids considered as magpies are in the genera Cissa, Urocissa, and Cyanopica.

Magpies of the genus Pica are generally found in temperate regions of Europe, Asia, and western North America, with populations also present in Tibet and high-elevation areas of Kashmir. Magpies of the genus Cyanopica are found in East Asia and the Iberian Peninsula. The birds called magpies in Australia are, however, not related to the magpies in the rest of the world.

Name
References dating back to Old English call the bird a "pie", derived from Latin pica and cognate to French pie; this term has fallen out of use. The tendency in previous centuries was to give birds common names, such as robin redbreast (which now is called the robin), jenny wren, etc. The magpie was originally variously maggie pie and mag pie. The term "pica" for the human disorder involving a compulsive desire to eat items that are not food is borrowed from the Latin name of the magpie (Pica pica), for its reputed tendency to feed on miscellaneous things.

Systematics and species

According to some studies, magpies do not form the monophyletic group they are traditionally believed to be; tails have elongated (or shortened) independently in multiple lineages of corvid birds. Among the traditional magpies,  two distinct lineages apparently exist. One consists of Holarctic species with black and white colouration, and is probably closely related to crows and Eurasian jays. The other contains several species from South to East Asia with vivid colouration, which is predominantly green or blue. The azure-winged magpie and the Iberian magpie, formerly thought to constitute a single species with a most peculiar distribution, have been shown to be two distinct species, and are classified as the genus Cyanopica.

Other research has cast doubt on the taxonomy of the Pica magpies, since  P. hudsonia and P. nuttalli may not be different species, whereas the Korean race of P. pica is genetically very distinct from the other Eurasian (as well as the North American) forms. Either the North American, Korean, and remaining Eurasian forms are accepted as three or four separate species, or else only a single species, Pica pica, exists.

Holarctic (black-and-white) magpies
Genus Pica
 Eurasian magpie, Pica pica
 Black-billed magpie, Pica hudsonia (may be conspecific with P. pica)
 Yellow-billed magpie, Pica nuttalli (may be conspecific with P. (pica) hudsonia)
 Asir magpie, Pica asirensis (may be conspecific with P. pica)
 Maghreb magpie, Pica mauritanica (may be conspecific with P. pica)
 Oriental magpie, Pica sericea (may be conspecific with P. pica)
 Black-rumped magpie. Pica bottenensis (may be conspecific with P. pica)

Oriental (blue and green) magpies
Genus Urocissa
 Taiwan blue magpie, Urocissa caerulea
 Red-billed blue magpie, Urocissa erythrorhyncha
 Yellow-billed blue magpie, Urocissa flavirostris
 White-winged magpie, Urocissa whiteheadi
 Sri Lanka blue magpie, Urocissa ornata
Genus Cissa
 Common green magpie, Cissa chinensis
 Indochinese green magpie, Cissa hypoleuca
 Javan green magpie, Cissa thalassina
 Bornean green magpie, Cissa jefferyi

Azure-winged magpies
Genus Cyanopica
 Azure-winged magpie, Cyanopica cyanus
 Iberian magpie, Cyanopica cooki

Other "magpies"
The black magpies, Platysmurus, are treepies; they are neither magpies, nor as was long believed, jays. Treepies are a distinct group of corvids externally similar to magpies.
The Australian magpie, Cracticus tibicen, is conspicuously "pied", with black and white plumage reminiscent of a Eurasian magpie. It is a member of the family Artamidae and not a corvid.
The magpie-robins, members of the genus Copsychus, have a similar "pied" appearance, but they are Old World flycatchers, unrelated to the corvids.

Human interactions

Cultural references

East Asia 

In East Asian cultures, the magpie is a very popular bird and is a symbol of good luck and fortune.

The magpie is a common subject in Chinese paintings. It is also often found in traditional Chinese poetry and couplets. In addition, in the folklore of China, all the magpies of the Qixi Festival every year will fly to the Milky Way and form a bridge, where the separated Cowherd and Weaver Girl will meet. In their culture the Milky Way is like a river, and the Cowherd and Weaver Girl refer to the famous α-Aquilae and α-Lyrae of modern Astronomy, respectively. For this reason the magpie bridge has come to symbolize a relationship between men and women.

Magpies have an important place in the birth myth of Ai Xinjue Luo Bukuri Yushun, the ancestor of the Qing dynasty.

The magpie is a national bird of Korea.

Europe 

In European culture the magpie is reputed to collect shiny objects such as wedding rings and other valuables, a well known example being Rossini's opera La Gazza Ladra (The Thieving Magpie). A recent study conducted by Exeter University found that Eurasian magpies express neophobia when presented with unfamiliar objects, and were less likely to approach or interact with the shiny objects - metal screws, foil rings and aluminium foil - used in the experiments.  However, magpies are naturally curious like other members of the corvid family, and may collect shiny objects, but do not favour shiny objects over dull ones.

In England, "a magpie’s nest" was a phrase used to describe something untidy and usually of little value. There is also a superstitious belief associated with magpies in the UK, whereby the sight of a single magpie is said to bring sorrow or bad luck, the sight of two magpies is said to bring joy or good luck and viewing more than two magpies is said to determine the sex of a future child, as described in the traditional nursery rhyme "One for Sorrow".

As pests 
Magpies are common orchard pests in some regions of the world.

Gallery

References

Further reading

External links
Magpie videos, photos and sounds on eBird

Corvidae
Magpies and treepies
Bird common names